Notre Dame College (Notre Dame College of Ohio or NDC) is a private Roman Catholic college in South Euclid, Ohio. Established in 1922 as a women's college, it has been coeducational since January 2001. Notre Dame College offers 30 majors and individually designed majors and confers undergraduate and graduate degrees through five academic divisions. The college had a total enrollment of 1,106 undergraduate students in fall 2020.

While the majority of Notre Dame's students are from Ohio, the student body represents 35 states and 21 countries. The college offers a number of extracurricular activities to its students, including athletics, honor societies, clubs, student organizations, and athletics.

Fielding athletic teams known as the Notre Dame Falcons, the college is a member of the National Collegiate Athletic Association (NCAA) at the Division II level. Notre Dame is a member of the Mountain East Conference (MEC), a Division II conference that began playing in the 2013–14 school year. Prior to joining the NCAA, the college competed in the NAIA as a member of the American Mideast Conference. The official school and athletic colors are royal blue and gold.

History 

Notre Dame College was founded in the summer of 1922 on Ansel Road in Cleveland as a women's college under the guidance of Mother M. Cecilia Romen. Later that year, Mother Mary Evarista Harks became NDC's first president (1922–1943). In its early years the college had a faculty population of 9 and a full-time student enrollment of 13 women and 11 novices; in addition 30 students were enrolled in extension courses. On June 15, 1925, NDC conferred its first graduating class in the form of two-year teaching certificates. In the following year, 14 students received their bachelor's degrees and state certificates to teach in Ohio high schools; becoming NDC's first graduating class of four-year college degrees. In June 1923, the Sisters leased  along Green Road in South Euclid to build a new campus and purchased   in 1924. Construction of the campus began in the fall of 1926 and opened on Sept. 17, 1928. The college was originally located in a single building and expanded over time, Harks Hall was built in 1955 to house resident students with two other residence halls built in the 1960s. NDC constructed the Clara Fritzsche Library in 1971 and the Keller Center in 1987.

Traditionally, this institution of higher education was primarily a residential campus, but in 1978, Notre Dame College began to offer a program known as Weekend College, or WECO. Local residents whose schedules prevented them from taking classes during the normal work week enrolled in weekend college classes to earn a degree. In 2003, WECO celebrated its 25th anniversary. On December 8, 1983, based on its architectural importance, Notre Dame College's historic Administration Building,  built in 1927 in the Tudor Revival and other styles, was added to the National Register of Historic Places as Notre Dame College of Ohio. The building,  designed by architect Thomas D. McLaughlin and built by contractor John T. Gill, originally housed the entire college.

In the fall of 1991, Notre Dame's Master of Education program started. The college saw its first M.Ed. graduates in 1994. Although men had been allowed to enroll in certain programs, such as NDC's Law Enforcement Education A.A. degree program in 1969 and later WECO and master's programs, in 2001 the college officially became coeducational with its first full-time male enrollment. The college graduated its first co-ed class on May 7, 2005. Since the college became coeducational it has seen enrollment double from nearly 1,000 in 2001 to over 2,000 in 2010. In 2008, NDC began construction on two additional residence halls, North and South halls. The structures opened in 2009 at a cost of $15 million.

Academics
Notre Dame College offers associate degrees, bachelor's degrees, and master's degrees and is divided into five Academic Divisions:
 Arts & Humanities
 Business Administration
 Education
 Nursing
 Science & Mathematics

The college also has three special programs and two interdisciplinary programs. NDC currently offers 30 majors in its bachelor's degree programs.  It also offers an Associate in Arts degree in Pastoral Ministry. and a master's degree in National Security and Intelligence Studies. In 2018, the college introduced graduate programs in Business.

Athletics
Notre Dame College's athletic teams are known as the Falcons, whose colors are blue and gold. The school sponsors 22 intercollegiate teams. The college is a member of the National Collegiate Athletic Association (NCAA) at the Division II level. In August 2012, Notre Dame became a charter member of the Mountain East Conference (MEC), a new Division II league that began play in the 2013–14 school year. The MEC, made up mostly of schools leaving the West Virginia Intercollegiate Athletic Conference, also includes another Ohio school and former NAIA member in Urbana University. It will sponsor 16 sports, eight each for men and women.

Notre Dame College previously competed in National Association of Intercollegiate Athletics (NAIA) as a member of the American Mideast Conference (AMC) from 1998–99 to 2010–11. The college began the transition process during the 2009–10 academic year as an NCAA candidacy institution and was granted provisional status for the 2011–12 academic year. In July 2012, the college received notice it was accepted as a full member starting in the 2012–13 academic year; as a full member the college is eligible for postseason conference and NCAA competition. During its time in the NAIA, the college was known for its men's wrestling program. The team won back-to-back NAIA National Championships in 2010 and 2011. In 2014, the school's second year of NCAA eligibility, Notre Dame College won the Division II national wrestling championship led by four-time national champion and undefeated wrestler Joey Davis.

The men's rugby team won the 2017 USA Rugby men's collegiate Division IAA national championship, defeating UC–Davis, 40–20.

Men's
Sports to be sponsored by the MEC are in italics.
 Baseball
 Basketball
 Bowling
 Football
 Golf
 Rugby
 Soccer
 Swimming and diving
 Wrestling

Women's
Sports to be sponsored by the MEC are in italics.
 Basketball
 Golf
 Lacrosse
 Rugby
 Soccer
 Softball
 Swimming and diving
 Water polo
 Volleyball

See also
 List of Roman Catholic universities and colleges in the United States

Notable alumni
 Gloria Joy Karpinski Battisti - A prolific civic leader in the Greater Cleveland metropolitan area who chaired the boards of numerous charitable organizations, as well as the Cleveland State University Board of Trustees and (vice-chaired) the Ohio Pardon and Parole Commission; a director of the National Council on Crime and Delinquency; a professor and chair of the NDC Sociology Department; married to federal district judge Frank J. Battisti
 Jarred Brooks - MMA fighter
 Joey Davis - MMA fighter
 Marye Anne Fox - physical organic chemist, university administrator
 Cody Garbrandt - MMA fighter
 Dorothy Schmitt Gauchat - Catholic Worker; co-founder — with her husband, William Gauchat — of Our Lady of the Wayside (Avon, Ohio), a home for children with severe disabilities; and foundress of the Colette Marie Infant Hospice for children with HIV/AIDS
 Mary Beth Ruskai - Mathematical physicist 
 Chris Via - professional bowler on the PBA Tour, winner of the 2021 U.S. Open
 Mary Helen Washington - English professor

References

External links

 Official website
 Official athletics website

Catholic universities and colleges in Ohio
Former women's universities and colleges in the United States
Universities and colleges in Cuyahoga County, Ohio
School buildings on the National Register of Historic Places in Ohio
National Register of Historic Places in Cuyahoga County, Ohio
Educational institutions established in 1922
1922 establishments in Ohio
Roman Catholic Diocese of Cleveland